"C'mon"/"Jo-Anna Says" is a double A-side single written and released by Swedish musician Per Gessle, from his Son of a Plumber project. This was the first double A-side released by Gessle. The artwork was shot in London by Anton Corbijn; the building on right of the shot is The Gherkin.

When Son of a Plumber was released in Europe during 2006, "Jo-Anna Says" was issued on its own to promote the album.

Track listing
Swedish CD single
(0946 346484 2 4; November 11, 2005)
"C'mon"
"Jo-Anna Says"

European Promo CD single
(CD PRO 4388; April 2006)
"Jo-Anna Says"

Charts

References

Per Gessle songs
Songs written by Per Gessle
2005 singles